Gordon G. Rogers (September 8, 1904, Hobart, Oklahoma – February 6, 1996), better known as Boody Rogers, was an American comic strip and comic book cartoonist who created the superhero parody Sparky Watts.

Born in Hobart, Oklahoma, Rogers attended the University of Arizona, the Chicago Academy of Fine Arts and the Chicago Art Institute. His artistic influences included Walter Berndt.

Comic strips

In the late 1920s and through the 1930s, Rogers illustrated newspaper strips for such syndicates as the Newspaper Feature Service and the Chicago Tribune New York News Syndicate. Rogers was Zack Mosley's assistant on The Adventures of Smilin' Jack when he sold his own strip, Sparky Watts, to the Frank Jay Markey Syndicate, which distributed such strips as Ed Wheelan's Big Top and Rube Goldberg's Lala Palooza. Sparky Watts debuted Monday, April 29, 1940 in some 40 newspapers. The strip ended when Rogers was drafted. During World War II he gave chalk talks to servicemen. His World War II experiences are detailed in his autobiography, Homeless Bound (1984).

Comic books
Rogers had work published in Dell Publishing's The Funnies, a seminal 1920s precursor of comic books. Rogers recalled his introduction to the job, taking place in 1929:

During the 1930s, Rogers illustrated cowboy comics for Dell Comics and DC Comics. Because Markey was part owner of the Columbia Comics Group (Skyman, The Face), reprints of Sparky Watts turned up in Columbia's Big Shot Comics, which featured other strips distributed by either Markey or the McNaught Syndicate (which distributed Mickey Finn and Toonerville Folks). Sparky Watts began in Big Shot #14 (June, 1941), and the character starred in four issues of his own comic for Columbia, beginning November, 1942.

Back from World War II, Rogers returned to syndication in 1946 with McNaught, and he drew new six-page stories for Big Shot, plus in 1947, he created another six issues for Sparky's own title. Rogers also illustrated Babe and Dudley for Prize Comics.

Rogers retired from comics in 1952 and began operating a pair of art supply stores in Arizona.

Bibliography

 Rogers, "Boody" Gordon. Homeless Bound. Seagraves, Texas: Pioneer Book Publishing, 1984).
 Yoe, Craig. Boody: The Bizarre Comics of Boody Rogers (Fantagraphics, 2009) Collection of the best Sparky Watts, Babe and Dudley stories.

References

Sources
 Fiveash, Chance. "Boody Rogers," The Comics Journal #275 (2006).
 Lambiek: Boody Rogers

External links
 Sparky Watts story by Boody Rogers
 Dudley story by Boody Rogers

1904 births
1996 deaths
American comic strip cartoonists
American comics artists
Golden Age comics creators
People from Hobart, Oklahoma